Wang Jinshan is a retired Chinese politician. He served as Governor of Anhui province from 2003 to 2007, and Communist Party Chief, the top political position in the province, from 2007 to 2010. He is a native of Gongzhuling, Jilin province. He graduated from Siping Normal School in Siping City.

References

1945 births
Living people
Political office-holders in Anhui
People from Siping
People's Republic of China politicians from Jilin
Chinese Communist Party politicians from Jilin